The Prahran Fire Station, also known as the Former Prahran Fire Station, is a historic fire station in Prahran, Victoria.

It is a two-storey brick building and has an attached brick watchtower.  It was built in 1889 and was considered advanced for its time, although its location on narrow Macquarie Street was difficult for fire apparatus to get out from, onto Chapel Street.

References

Fire stations in Victoria (Australia)
Heritage-listed buildings in Melbourne
Fire stations completed in 1889
Buildings and structures in the City of Stonnington
1889 establishments in Australia